Black Lake is a lake in the municipality of Sioux Narrows-Nestor Falls, Kenora District in Northwestern Ontario, Canada. It is part of the Hudson Bay drainage basin, and is on the Black River, which is its primary inflow at the east and outflow at the southwest.

Tributaries
Black River
Graphic Creek 
Johnny Creek

See also
List of lakes in Ontario

References

Other map sources:

Lakes of Kenora District